Alena Piatrouna Filipava (born October 10, 1987, in Minsk) is an amateur Belarusian freestyle wrestler, who played for the women's featherweight category. 
She won the bronze medal at the 2009 World Wrestling Championships in Herning, Denmark, against Tatiana Padilla of the United States, in addition to her silver at the European Championships in Vilnius, Lithuania.

Filipava made her official debut at the 2008 Summer Olympics in Beijing, where she competed for the 55 kg class in freestyle wrestling, an event which was imminently dominated by world champion Saori Yoshida from Japan. She lost the second preliminary match to Kazakhstan's Olga Smirnova, with a two-set technical score (3–2, 0–3, 2–4), and a classification score of 1–3, finishing only in thirteenth place.

References

External links
NBC Olympics Profile
 

Belarusian female sport wrestlers
1987 births
Living people
Olympic wrestlers of Belarus
Wrestlers at the 2008 Summer Olympics
Sportspeople from Minsk
World Wrestling Championships medalists
21st-century Belarusian women